is a trans-Neptunian object (TNO) that resides in the Kuiper belt and was discovered on 19 August 2001 by Marc William Buie at Cerro Tololo Observatory. It is classified as a plutino, which means that it is in the 3:2 mean motion resonance with Neptune.

Physical properties
 is a small plutino occupying the 3:2 mean motion resonance with Neptune. Its size is estimated at 122 km assuming a comet-like albedo of about 4%.

 has a double peaked light curve with a large amplitude, which has changed from 1.14 in 2003 to 0.7 in 2010. This large amplitude implies that it is actually a contact binary consisting of two elongated components of approximately equal size viewed from almost the equatorial perspective. The size of the components separated by the distance of approximately 300 km will be then about 95 km each. The density of  should be at least 0.6–0.7 g/cm3 for it to remain bound.

See also

References

External links 
 

Plutinos
2001 QG298
Contact binary (small Solar System body)
20010819